Dennis A. Reed was a member of the Wisconsin State Assembly.

Biography
Reed was born on March 4, 1822, in Norwalk, Ohio. He later resided in Ottawa County, Michigan, and Sturgeon Bay in Door County, Wisconsin. During the American Civil War, he became a first lieutenant with the 49th Wisconsin Volunteer Infantry Regiment of the Union Army.

Political career
Reed was Ottawa County judge from 1850 to 1852. He was a member of the assembly during the 1865 Session. Previously, he was postmaster of the assembly in 1857 and assistant sergeant-at-arms of the assembly in 1858. Additionally, Reed was district attorney of Door County, Wisconsin. He was an independent politician.

References

People from Norwalk, Ohio
People from Ottawa County, Michigan
People from Sturgeon Bay, Wisconsin
Members of the Wisconsin State Assembly
District attorneys in Wisconsin
Wisconsin state court judges
19th-century American judges
Wisconsin Independents
Michigan Independents
People of Wisconsin in the American Civil War
Union Army officers
Wisconsin postmasters
1822 births
Year of death missing
Military personnel from Michigan